The term Spicks and Specks may refer to

Spicks and Specks (album), a 1966 album by The Bee Gees
"Spicks and Specks" (song), a 1966 song by The Bee Gees
Spicks and Specks (TV series), an Australian music-themed television quiz show (named after the Bee Gees song)
Spicks and Specks (2014 TV series), a revival of the original Australian music-themed television quiz show